Srinath Krishnamoorthy (born 24 June 1986 in Palakkad, Kerala) is an Indian novelist and blogger. His first novel, Hope We Never Meet Again, a psycho-analytic thriller which deals with murderers that go unpunished, became one of the most sold out books at the Delhi World Book Fair 2016, Asia's largest book fair. There has also been news of a movie adaptation of the novel, but neither the author nor the makers have come out in open with a confirmation.

He right now serves as Lecturer for the University of West of England program in Artificial Intelgence at Villa College;  Malè Maldives.

References

Indian male novelists
Living people
1986 births
Writers from Palakkad